Cor Wilders (27 June 1916 – 24 January 1998) was a Dutch footballer. He played in eight matches for the Netherlands national football team from 1937 to 1946.

References

External links
 

1916 births
1998 deaths
Dutch footballers
Netherlands international footballers
Place of birth missing
Association footballers not categorized by position